Derek Livingston (born January 5, 1991) is a Canadian snowboarder. He is a two-time Olympian in half-pipe representing Canada at the 2014 Winter Olympics in Sochi and the 2018 Winter Olympics in Pyongchang.

In January 2022, Livingston was named to his third Olympic team: Canada's 2022 Olympic team. However, after sustaining an injury in training, Livingston withdrew from the games.

References

External links
 
 
 
 
 

1991 births
Living people
Canadian male snowboarders
Olympic snowboarders of Canada
Snowboarders at the 2014 Winter Olympics
Snowboarders at the 2018 Winter Olympics
Sportspeople from Scarborough, Toronto